Dysomma melanurum is an eel in the family Synaphobranchidae (cutthroat eels). It was described by Johnson T. F. Chen and Herman Ting-Chen Weng in 1967. It is a subtropical, marine eel which is known from the western Pacific Ocean. Males can reach a maximum total length of 23.7 centimetres.

References

Synaphobranchidae
Fish described in 1967